Gobius rubropunctatus is a species of goby native to inshore waters of the Atlantic Ocean near the coasts of Africa from Mauritania to Ghana down to a depth of about .  This species can reach a length of  TL.

References

rubropunctatus
Fish of the Atlantic Ocean
Fish of Africa
Tropical fish
Fish described in 1951